Nothing's Sacred is the autobiography of comedian Lewis Black. It was published in 2005, and republished in 2006 (paperback edition). The 2006 publication contains new material and one of the plays he wrote during his career as a playwright. The book has also been released in unabridged audio CD format, narrated by Black himself. The book is narrated in the same fashion as Black's stand-up routines, with explicit language, sarcasm, and constant fits of rage.

The book primarily accounts Lewis' admiration for his seemingly eccentric family, his disregard for authority, his education, past habitual drug use, his perspectives on current issues, and other real-life events such as his hitchhiking trip in Europe or his late pet dog, John-John. The book's layout is in semi-chronological order. The book has no table of contents and a lengthy page of acknowledgments.

Excerpts from the book 

"So many leaves, so little time. I will buy a leaf blower."
"If there is a hell, it is modeled after Jr. High."
"Just the memory of it makes me want to go to the bathroom."
"I was lucky to have an animal like that as my owner."
"Somehow, psychopaths always get service."
"We are passing on a legacy of shit."
"Although I graduated third in my class, I had to travel all the way to Paris to learn one of life's biggest lessons; 'One does not shit in a bidet, because one has to clean it up.'"
"If The Post Office didn't already exist, Kafka would've invented it."

See also
The Parts That Were Left Out of the Kennedy Book

2005 non-fiction books
Comedy books
Show business memoirs